René Havard (20 December 1923 – 7 December 1987) was a French film actor. He appeared in 80 films between 1946 and 1985. He was born and died in Paris, France.

Selected filmography

 That's Not the Way to Die (1946) - L'assistant
 La bataille du feu (1949)
 Follow That Man (1953) - Un inspecteur
 Le Guérisseur (1953) - Un interne
 The Unfrocked One (1954) - Un officier
 Quay of Blondes (1954)
 The Sheep Has Five Legs (1954) - Le liftier
 Poisson d'avril (1954) - L'examinateur
 Marchandes d'illusions (1954) - Le souteneur
 Huis clos (1954) - Un soldat
 Interdit de séjour (1955)
 The Babes Make the Law (1955) - Calamart
 Série noire (1955) - Rinaldo
 Stopover in Orly (1955) - André
 Sophie et le crime (1955) - Tony
 Gueule d'ange (1955) - Caniche
 Les indiscrètes (1956) - Maurice
 The Babes in the Secret Service (1956) - Calamar / Sébastien / Le clochard
 Bob le flambeur (1956) - Inspecteur Morin
 The Mountain (1956) - Radio Operator in Van (uncredited)
 Crime et châtiment (1956) - L'inspecteur Noblet
 L'Homme et l'Enfant (1956) - Un complice de Zajir
 Les violents (1957) - Inspecteur Damien
 Les Suspects (1957) - Un technicien sud-tunisien 
 La Polka des menottes (1957) - Roger Le Chinois
 Oeil pour oeil (1957) - L'interne
 Paris clandestin (1957) - Ernest
 Ces dames préfèrent le mambo (1957) - Le timonier de l'Alizée
 Police judiciaire (1958) - Cassou
 Cigarettes, Whiskey and Wild Women (1959) - Fernand
 The Indestructible (1959) - Loulou
 La Valse du Gorille (1959) - Le chimiste
 Babette Goes to War (1959) - Louis
 Rue des prairies (1959) - Le photographe
 The Cow and I (1959) - Vicomte Bussière - prisonnier de guerre
 Le Panier à crabes (1960) - Le premier assistant
 Le Dernier Quart d'heure (1962) - L'inspecteur Moret
 Gigot (1962) - Albert
 À couteaux tirés (1964) - Bobby
 Lost Command (1966) - Fernand
 Line of Demarcation (1966) - Loiseau
 It's Your Move (1969)
 L'Auvergnat et l'Autobus (1969) - Petit rôle (uncredited)
 Les patates (1969) - Lulu
 L'amour (1970) - Le chauffard
 Vogue la galère (1973) - Petit Rouquier
 Innocents with Dirty Hands (1975) - (uncredited)
 Les demoiselles à péage (1975)
 Les Mal Partis (1976) - Le curé du village
 Gloria (1977) - Le chauffeur de taxi qui a fait la Marne
 C'est encore loin l'Amérique? (1980)
 Train d'enfer (1985)

References

External links

1923 births
1987 deaths
French male film actors
Male actors from Paris
20th-century French male actors